The Newquay Voice is a local weekly newspaper, launched in September 2001 by Andrew and Chrissie Laming, that publishes every Wednesday from Newquay, Cornwall, United Kingdom covering the northern part of the former borough of Restormel. The paper has five editorial staff including a full-time photographer and sport editor. The paper is edited by Simon Fernley, a journalist with more than 20 years experience of the patch who was, prior to joining the Voice, sub-editor at the Cornish Guardian.

The Newquay Voice has a sister newspaper, the St. Austell Voice, launched in 2006, that covers St Austell, the Clay Country from Fraddon to St Stephens and the coast from Fowey to Mevagissey. 

The papers provide a locally owned and focussed alternative to the large regional titles that dominate the region. The Voice titles were the first in the area to go full colour and have bucked the trend to centralize production; by basing the team responsible for each edition in central offices in their respective towns they remain closer to the communities they serve. Both titles are printed by the Newbury News.

Andrew Laming launched the RSL radio station Malibu Surf FM which broadcast annually in Newquay from 1999 to 2005. The station formed part of the successful bid for the Cornwall licence that launched in 2006 as Atlantic FM. Atlantic FM was sold to Global Radio in 2012 and is now branded as a Heart station.

External links

Newquay Voice website
Newquay Voice and St. Austell Voice photos at Cornwall-Photos.com

Newspapers published in Cornwall
Newquay